The 1948 Saskatchewan general election was held on June 24, 1948, to elect members of the Legislative Assembly of Saskatchewan.

The Co-operative Commonwealth Federation government of Premier Tommy Douglas was re-elected with a reduced majority in the legislature.

Although the share of the popular vote won by the Liberal Party of Walter Tucker fell by almost five percentage points, the party increased its representation in the legislature from 5 seats to 19.

The Social Credit Party of Saskatchewan, which had won 2 seats and 16% of the popular vote in the 1938 election – only to disappear in the 1944 election – returned to win over 8% of the vote, but no seats.

The Progressive Conservative Party – now led by Rupert Ramsay – continued to decline, and was also shut out of the legislature.

In some ridings, the Progressive Conservatives appear to have run joint candidates with the Liberals in failed attempts to defeat the CCF. These candidates ran as Liberal-PC candidates. The successful Conservative Liberal candidate – Alex "Hammy" McDonald – immediately joined the Liberal caucus upon being sworn in as an MLA.

Results

Note: * Party did not nominate candidates in previous election.

Percentages

Ranking

Riding results
Names in bold represent cabinet ministers and the Speaker. Party leaders are italicized. The symbol " ** " indicates MLAs who are not running again.

Northwestern Saskatchewan

|-
|bgcolor=whitesmoke|Athabasca
|
|Axel Olsen341
|
|
|
|
|| 
|Louis M. Marion (Ind.) 628Joseph D. Le Chasseur (Ind.) 225
|| 
|Louis Marcien Marion
|-
|bgcolor=whitesmoke|Cut Knife
|| 
|Isidore Nollet3,027
|
|William Bradley1,531
|
|Fred F. Wilson1,642
|
|
|| 
|Isidore Charles Nollet
|-
|bgcolor=whitesmoke|Meadow Lake
|
|Herschel Howell2,635
|| 
|William Lofts3,307
|
|John W. Evanishen1,081
|
|
|| 
|Herschel Lee Howell
|-
|bgcolor=whitesmoke|Redberry
|
|Dmytro Lazorko2,357
|| 
|Bernard Korchinski2,571
|
|
|
|Robert C. Glen (PC) 643
|| 
|Dmytro Matthew Lazorko
|-
|bgcolor=whitesmoke|Rosthern
|
|Wilbert S. Henschel959
|| 
|Walter Tucker2,964
|
|George W. Beilhartz1,736
|
|
|| 
|Peter J. Hooge**
|-
|bgcolor=whitesmoke|Shellbrook
|| 
|Louis Larsen2,981
|
|W.R. Vincent2,806
|
|George J. Klein959
|
|
|| 
|Guy Franklin Van Eaton**
|-
|bgcolor=whitesmoke|The Battlefords
|
|Alex Connon3,554
|| 
|Paul Prince3,990
|
|
|
|
|| 
|Alexander Duff Connon
|-
|bgcolor=whitesmoke|Turtleford
|
|Bob Wooff2,280
|| 
|Leo Trippe2,462
|
|Matthew Slager1,357
|
|
|| 
|Robert Hanson Wooff

|style="width: 130px"|Liberal
|Hugh Maher
|align="right"|3,296
|align="right"|48.22%
|align="right"|-4.67

|CCF
|Alex Connon
|align="right"|3,158
|align="right"|46.20%
|align="right"|-0.91

|Prog. Conservative
|David J. Thiessen
|align="right"|381
|align="right"|5.58%
|align="right"|–
|- bgcolor="white"
!align="left" colspan=3|Total
!align="right"|6,835
!align="right"|100.00%
!align="right"|

Northeastern Saskatchewan

|-
|bgcolor=whitesmoke|Cumberland
|
|Joseph Johnson425
|| 
|Lorne Blanchard656
|
|
|
|Joseph Maxim Buote (Ind.) 40
|| 
|Les Walter Lee**
|-
|bgcolor=whitesmoke|Humboldt
|
|Ben Putnam2,657
|| 
|Arnold Loehr2,689
|
|Joseph A. Thauberger2,515
|
|
|| 
|Ben Putnam
|-
|bgcolor=whitesmoke|Kelvington
|| 
|Peter Howe2,991
|
|Gladstone Mansfield Ferrie2,639
|
|Frederick A. Patrick1,225
|
|
|| 
|Peter Anton Howe
|-
|bgcolor=whitesmoke|Kinistino
|
|William J. Boyle2,991
|| 
|William C. Woods3,086
|
|
|
|
|| 
|William James Boyle
|-
|bgcolor=whitesmoke|Melfort
|
|Oakland Valleau4,035
|| 
|John Egnatoff4,065
|
|
|
|
|| 
|Oakland Woods Valleau
|-
|bgcolor=whitesmoke|Prince Albert
|| 
|Larry McIntosh6,944
|
|Charles McIntosh6,052
|
|Ralph Ernst579
|
|
|| 
|Lachlan Fraser McIntosh
|-
|bgcolor=whitesmoke|Tisdale
|| 
|John Hewgill Brockelbank5,242
|
|Donald L.W. Hood3,980
|
|
|
|William Lucas Hayes (PC) 1,171
|| 
|John Hewgill Brockelbank
|-
|bgcolor=whitesmoke|Torch River
|| 
|John Denike2,260
|
|Harold Guloien1,779
|
|Leo Nile Nicholson1,448
|
|
|| 
|John Bruce Harris**

West Central Saskatchewan

|-
|bgcolor=whitesmoke|Arm River
|
|E.L. Heinrich2,263
|| 
|Gustaf Herman Danielson3,400
|
|Gabriel J. Giesinger689
|
|
|| 
|Gustaf Herman Danielson
|-
|bgcolor=whitesmoke|Biggar
|| 
|Woodrow Lloyd3,695
|
|Andrew S. Shaw2,987
|
|
|
|
|| 
|Woodrow Stanley Lloyd
|-
|bgcolor=whitesmoke|Hanley
|| 
|Robert A. Walker2,417
|
|Clayton L. Pascoe2,366
|
|Frederick E. Roluf512
|
|Emmett M. Hall (PC) 1,025
|| 
|James Smith Aitken**
|-
|bgcolor=whitesmoke|Kerrobert-Kindersley
|| 
|John Wellbelove3,333
|
|Fred Larson3,155
|
|Norman Wildman1,063
|
|
|| 
|John Wellbelove
|-
|bgcolor=whitesmoke|Rosetown
|| 
|John T. Douglas3,647
|
|
|
|
|
|Alvin Hamilton (PC) 3,218
|| 
|John Taylor Douglas
|-
|bgcolor=whitesmoke|Watrous
|| 
|James A. Darling2,968
|
|Andrew William Michayluk2,829
|
|Martin Kelln1,092
|
|
|| 
|James Andrew Darling
|-
|bgcolor=whitesmoke|Wilkie
|
|Hans O. Hansen2,566
|| 
|John W. Horsman3,143
|
|George K. Nicholson1,110
|
|O. Allen Bently (PC) 329
|| 
|Hans Ove Hansen

East Central Saskatchewan

|-
|bgcolor=whitesmoke|Canora
|| 
|Alex Kuziak3,104
|
|Stephen T. Shabbits2,453
|
|Stanley W. Gorchynski1,801
|
|
|| 
|Myron Henry Feeley**
|-
|bgcolor=whitesmoke|Last Mountain
|| 
|Jacob Benson3,755
|
|James Wilfrid Gardiner3,001
|
|Godfrey Kelln1,219
|
|
|| 
|Jacob Benson
|-
|bgcolor=whitesmoke|Melville
|
|George T. Webster4,690
|| 
|Patrick Deshaye5,302
|
|John W. Hauser1,014
|
|
|| 
|Bill Arthurs**
|-
|bgcolor=whitesmoke|Pelly
|
|Dan Daniels2,476
|| 
|John G. Banks2,646
|
|John W. Kowalyshen1,020
|
|William M. Berezowski(Labour Prog.) 1,301
|| 
|Daniel Zederayko Daniels
|-
|bgcolor=whitesmoke|Saltcoats
|
|Joseph L. Phelps3,620
|| 
|Asmundur Loptson3,945
|
|George A. Dulmage807
|
|
|| 
|Joseph Lee Phelps
|-
|bgcolor=whitesmoke|Touchwood
|| 
|Tom Johnston2,627
|
|John Joseph Collins2,459
|
|Harold Fletcher1,097
|
|
|| 
|Tom Johnston
|-
|bgcolor=whitesmoke|Wadena
|| 
|Frederick Dewhurst4,218
|
|Halldor K. Halldorson2,930
|
|Denis Dunlop729
|
|
|| 
|Frederick Arthur Dewhurst
|-
|bgcolor=whitesmoke|Yorkton
|| 
|Arthur Swallow3,795
|
|Andrew M. Kindred3,256
|
|Joshua N. Haldeman1,792
|
|
|| 
|Arthur Percy Swallow

Southwest Saskatchewan

|-
|bgcolor=whitesmoke|Elrose
|| 
|Maurice J. Willis4,153
|
|
|
|
|
|Harry N. McKenzie (Ind. Liberal) 3,299
|| 
|Maurice John Willis
|-
|bgcolor=whitesmoke|Gravelbourg
|
|Henry Houze2,525
|| 
|Edward Culliton2,935
|
|Milton A. Wilson404
|
|
|| 
|Henry Edmund Houze
|-
|bgcolor=whitesmoke|Gull Lake
|| 
|Alvin C. Murray4,251
|
|
|
|William E. Cowie936
|
|Jonas A. Johnson (Liberal-PC) 2,983
|| 
|Alvin Cecil Murray
|-
|bgcolor=whitesmoke|Maple Creek
|
|Beatrice J. Trew2,590
|| 
|Alexander C. Cameron2,920
|
|A.J. Miller2,491
|
|
|| 
|Beatrice Janet Trew
|-
|bgcolor=whitesmoke|Morse
|| 
|James W. Gibson3,069
|
|Ronald D. Miller2,465
|
|Fred Erhardt694
|
|John K. Rosa (PC) 481
|| 
|James William Gibson
|-
|bgcolor=whitesmoke|Notukeu-Willow Bunch
|| 
|Niles Leonard Buchanan4,048
|
|Hans Loken3,483
|
|
|
|
|| 
|Niles Leonard Buchanan
|-
|bgcolor=whitesmoke|Swift Current
|| 
|Harry Gibbs5,273
|
|Clarence J. Orton5,091
|
|
|
|
|| 
|Harry Gibbs

|-

|style="width: 130px"|CCF
|Thomas Bentley
|align="right"|3,627
|align="right"|51.36%
|align="right"|-0.67

|Liberal
|Harold M. Haney
|align="right"|2,792
|align="right"|39.54%
|align="right"|–

|Prog. Conservative
|Charles H. Howlett
|align="right"|643
|align="right"|9.10%
|align="right"|–
|- bgcolor="white"
!align="left" colspan=3|Total
!align="right"|7,062
!align="right"|100.00%
!align="right"|

|-

| style="width: 130px" |CCF
|Edward H. Walker
|align="right"|2,571
|align="right"|50.76%
|align="right"|+7.70

|Liberal
|Ronald A. MacLean
|align="right"|2,494
|align="right"|49.24%
|align="right"|-0.81
|- bgcolor="white"
!align="left" colspan=3|Total
!align="right"|5,065
!align="right"|100.00%
!align="right"|

Southeast Saskatchewan

|-
|bgcolor=whitesmoke|Bengough
|| 
|Allan L.S. Brown3,599
|
|Archie V. Wightman2,627
|
|Arnold L. Meginbir705
|
|
|| 
|Allan L. Samuel Brown
|-
|bgcolor=whitesmoke|Cannington
|
|Ralph Hjertaas3,422
|| 
|William Patterson4,687
|
|Peter Franchuk500
|
|
|| 
|William John Patterson
|-
|bgcolor=whitesmoke|Lumsden
|| 
|William S. Thair2,876
|
|Henry P. Mang2,220
|
|Gustav D. Pelzer744
|
|Arthur M. Pearson (PC) 1,003
|| 
|William Sancho Thair
|-
|bgcolor=whitesmoke|Milestone
|| 
|Jacob Erb2,803
|
|
|
|George M. Howell1,020
|
|Lionel Aston (Liberal-PC) 2,363
|| 
|Frank Keem Malcolm**
|-
|bgcolor=whitesmoke|Moosomin
|
|Ivan Burden3,442
|
|
|
|
|| 
|Alex "Hammy" McDonald (Conservative-Liberal) 5,251
|| 
|Arthur Thomas Procter**
|-
|bgcolor=whitesmoke|Qu'Appelle-Wolseley
|
|Warden Burgess3,903
|| 
|Frederick M. Dundas4,470
|
|Evert F. Josephson1,253
|
|
|| 
|Warden Burgess
|-
|bgcolor=whitesmoke|Souris-Estevan
|
|Charles Cuming4,741
|| 
|John E. McCormack4,924
|
|John K. Strachan417
|
|
|| 
|Charles David Cuming
|-
|bgcolor=whitesmoke|Weyburn
|| 
|Tommy Douglas6,273
|
|
|
|Isabel Paxman638
|
|F. Charles Eaglesham (Liberal-PC) 4,228
|| 
|Tommy Douglas

|style="width: 130px"|Liberal
|Rosscoe A. McCarthy
|align="right"|4,200
|align="right"|54.06%
|align="right"|-0.38

|CCF
|Edward G. McCullough
|align="right"|3,569
|align="right"|45.94%
|align="right"|+6.19
|- bgcolor="white"
!align="left" colspan=3|Total
!align="right"|7,769
!align="right"|100.00%
!align="right"|

Urban constituencies

|-
|bgcolor=whitesmoke|Moose Jaw City
|| 
|John Wesley Corman7,534
D. Henry R. Heming7,331
|
|
|
|
|
|H. Gordon Young (Ind.) 5,240
J. Fraser McClellan (Ind.) 4,955
|| 
|John Wesley Corman
Dempster Henry R. Heming
|-
|bgcolor=whitesmoke|Saskatoon City
|| 
|John Henry Sturdy14,970
Arthur T. Stone14,295
|
|L. Charles Sherman11,551
|
|Malcolm J. Haver1,959
|
|Rupert D. Ramsay (PC) 13,376
|| 
|John Henry Sturdy
Arthur T. Stone
|-
|bgcolor=whitesmoke|Regina City
|| 
|Charlie Williams20,475
Clarence Fines20,474
|
|Wilfred G. Brown16,578
|
|Walter E. Stowe1,049
Anthony E. Kovatch971
|
|Allan W. Embury (PC) 16,740
|| 
|Charles Cromwell Williams
Clarence Melvin Fines

See also
List of Saskatchewan general elections
List of Saskatchewan provincial electoral districts
List of political parties in Saskatchewan

References
Saskatchewan Archives Board - Election Results By Electoral Division

Saskatchewan general election
General election
1948
Saskatchewan general election